Hesder ( "arrangement"; also Yeshivat Hesder ) is an Israeli yeshiva program which combines advanced Talmudic studies with military service in the Israel Defense Forces, usually within a Religious Zionist framework. The program allows Orthodox Jewish men to serve in the Israeli military while still engaging in Torah study.

Description
Hesder service usually lasts a total of five years, within which participants are officially soldiers in the IDF. Through those five years, 16 months are dedicated to actual army service, comprising both training and active duty. In some Hesder Yeshivas, service lasts six years, of which 24 months are army service. Almost all Hesder Yeshiva students serve in the army as combat soldiers. The remainder of the time in Hesder is designated for full-time Torah study. Some students study for several years after this mandatory term. Yeshivot Hesder typically have 150-300 students; some of the larger yeshivot have up to 500 students, while some have fewer than 100 students.
The largest is the Hesder Yeshiva of Sderot.

The typical Yeshivat Hesder functions along the lines of a traditional Orthodox yeshiva, with an emphasis on in-depth study of the Talmud. However, the curriculum of a Hesder yeshiva often additionally includes an increased focus on Tanakh and Jewish philosophy. In addition, most Yeshivot Hesder encourage their students to spend time helping the needy in surrounding communities.

Many of the Yeshivot Hesder also support a Kollel, and offer a Semicha ("rabbinic ordination") program, usually in preparation for the "Semicha of the Rabbanut"; many Hesder graduates would also obtain semicha from the late Rabbi Zalman Nechemia Goldberg. Since 1990, various hesder yeshivot have established, or are associated with, teachers' institutes. Graduates of these yeshivot are thus often active in the educational system of the national-religious, both as rabbis and as teachers.

A number have programs for students from the Diaspora ("overseas programs") lasting one or two years; these vary in size from about ten people to over a hundred and fifty. The most prominent of these programs are those of Yeshivat Kerem B'Yavneh, Yeshivat Hakotel, Yeshivat Sha%27alvim, and Yeshivat Har Etzion.

As an alternative to Hesder, some male high school students opt to study at a one-year mechina, and then proceed to a regular period of military service.

Students at Mercaz HaRav, and some Hardal yeshivot, such as Har Hamor, undertake their Service through a modified framework called "Hesder Mercaz"; usually serving in the artillery. 
Yeshivat Ma'ale Gilboa through a framework called shiluv, integrates two years of Torah study with the full three years military service.

History
The idea of hesder yeshivas is attributed to Yehuda Amital, a rabbi and Israeli politician who served in the Haganah, fought in the 1948 Arab–Israeli War. After writing an essay about the religious and moral aspects of military service, he envisaged a program for combining army service and Torah study. Following the Six-Day War, Rav Amital became the founding Rosh Yeshiva of Yeshivat Har Etzion, a Hesder Yeshiva in Alon Shevut that Amital headed for 40 years.
 
The first yeshivat hesder, Kerem B'Yavneh, was established in 1953 modelled on Nahal, a unit combining time on a (frontier) agricultural settlement with army service.

In 1991, the hesder yeshiva program was awarded the Israel Prize for its special contribution to society and the State of Israel.

A new Knesset law on Haredi yeshiva student exemptions addresses the legal status of Hesder service and yeshivot.

In 2011, there were 68 hesder yeshivas in Israel, with a total of over 8,500 students.

List of yeshivot

See also
 Haim Drukman
 Midrasha
 Netzah Yehuda Battalion
 Sherut Leumi
 Torato Omanuto - The special arrangement for Ultra-Orthodox Israelis (Haredi Judaism), on postponements or special exemptions from the Israel Defense Forces (IDF) compulsory service.
 Religion in Israel
 List of Israel Prize recipients
 Yeshiva #Israel
 Religious Zionism #Educational institutions & #Military service

References

External links
 Association of Hesder Yeshivot

Israel Prize for special contribution to society and the State recipients
Israel Prize recipients that are organizations
Religion in the Israel Defense Forces
Orthodox yeshivas